Bács-Kiskun is a county (vármegye in Hungarian) located in southern Hungary. It was created as a result of World War II, merging the prewar Bács-Bodrog and the southern parts of Pest-Pilis-Solt-Kiskun counties. With an area of 8,445 km2, Bács-Kiskun is the largest county in the country. The terrain is mostly flat with slight emergences around Baja. The county seat and largest city of Bács-Kiskun is Kecskemét.

The county is also part of the Danube-Kris-Mures-Tisa euroregion.

Geography
The county is known across Europe for its natural environment. Kiskunság National Park is located in the area.

Location
Bács-Kiskun borders Baranya, Tolna, and Fejér on the west (across the Danube River); Pest to the north, Jász-Nagykun-Szolnok and Csongrád on the east, across the Tisza River. To the south Bács-Kiskun shares the international border with Serbia.

Bács-Kiskun lies on the Great Hungarian Plain. The difference between its highest and lowest elevations is only 80 m.

Rivers
 Danube
 Tisza

Lakes
 Lake Szelid
 Lake Vadkert

Symbols

Etymology
In German, it is known as Komitat Bács-Kiskun, in Croatian and Serbian as Bačko-kiškunska županija and in Slovak as Báčsko-malokumánska župa.

Coat of arms and flag
Coat of arms of Bács-Kiskun County is a modern creation based on older arms. The escutcheon is standing and shredded shield. The shield has a foam skirt with silver and blue shield. The arched upper edge of the shield has a three-barrel, oval-shaped, closed-door, golden wall clock.

The flag is vertically divided into two equal sections (blue and white), with the coat of arms on it. Its ratio is 2:1. The use of both coat of arms and flag is regulated by the county council.

History
Bács-Kiskun county was created from the pre-1938 counties Bács-Bodrog and Pest-Pilis-Solt-Kiskun.
The county came into existence by the unification of some areas of Pest-Pilis-Solt-Kiskun (southern half) and Bács-Bodrog county after World War II. The name Bács derives from the city of the same name, Bač in modern Serbia (known as Bács in Hungarian), while Kiskun is Hungarian name for the region of Little Cumania.

Demographics

In 2015, it had a population of 513,687 and the population density was 61/km2.

Although the population is decreasing, the birth rate in the county is positive, unlike in any other regions in Hungary.

Ethnicity
The population of the county is almost homogeneous, with a Hungarian majority (94.1%). Some Croatian, German and Serbian people live around Hajós and Baja.

Total population (2011 census): 520,331
Ethnic groups (2011 census):
Identified themselves: 475 004 persons:
Hungarians: 445 978 (93,89%)
Gypsies: 10 918 (2,30%)
Germans: 9 528 (2,01%)
Others and indefinable: 8 570 (1,80%)
Approx. 67,000 persons in Bács-Kiskun County did not declare their ethnic group at the 2011 census.

Religion

Religious adherence in the county according to 2011 census:

Catholic – 259,822 (Roman Catholic – 258,758; Greek Catholic – 998);
Reformed – 45,933; 
Evangelical – 13,288;
Orthodox – 387;
other religions – 9,279; 
Non-religious – 62,391; 
Atheism – 4,436;
Undeclared – 124,795.

Economy
Bács-Kiskun county accounted for 3.7% of the Gross Value Added of Hungary in 2001. With almost EUR 1.9 billion, the GVA in Bács-Kiskun had increased by 50% compared to 1995.

Sectors
The primary sector accounted for 12.3% of the Gross Value Added of the county in 2001, and this was the highest share of any county. However, this share is declining over the years: it was 15.6% in 1995.

The share of the secondary sector is relatively constant over the years, with 30.9% of the Gross Value Added in 2001 (compared to 29.5% in 1995). The tertiary sector's GVA has increased most, although it still had a low share (56.8%) compared to the country as a whole (64.4%).

Service and trade
Service and trade are the dominant sectors of Bács-Kiskun's economy, where privatisation occurred first.

80% of the industrial output is represented by the food, machine, wood, and printing industries. The more substantial companies in the region attracted more investment. In the course of privatisation the Kecskemét cannery was purchased by Heinz, the Kiskunhalas textile mill partially by Levi's. During the privatisation, the Danube Knitting Mill in Baja was acquired by an American financial investment group

Among the industrial companies operating in the area of Baja are UNILEVER Rt. producing deep-frozen products, the Bread factory of Bácska Sütoipari Rt., the abattoir of DÉLHÚS and the Pannonia Brewery. The local government of Baja are encouraging the expansion of foreign capital by reducing local taxes.

There are approximately 39,600 firms in the county, representing 4.6% of the national total. The majority of companies employ only several people; indeed, 95% have 10 or fewer employees. Two percent of companies belong in the medium category, employing between 21 and 50 people, while the number and proportion of those employing 300 or more is very small.

Agriculture
Fruit, vegetable, corn and wheat production are the most successful branches of the region's agriculture. Compared to the other Hungarian counties, Bács-Kiskun has the second largest number of pigs (10% of the Hungarian pig stock) and 7% of cattle stock. The stock of sheep made up 194,000 at the end of 2002, 17.6% of Hungary's total stock and the largest in Hungary.

Transport

Road
On account of its central location, a great deal of the nation's traffic necessarily crosses the county. The total length of main roads in the county was 2,213 kilometres in 2002 so for every 100 square kilometres of land area, there are 26 kilometres of main road. Despite the fact that a great deal of labour has gone into improving the quality of the roads in the last decade, there has been a deterioration in their condition on account of their intensive use. Fifty-six kilometres of motorways crossed the county in 2002, making the road link with Serbia and the Balkans.

Highway M5 and Road 5 go through Bács-Kiskun. There are many second-class roads throughout the county, giving easy access to every village. The international railroad lines Budapest-Subotica-Belgrade and the national railroad Budapest-Cegléd-Szeged pass through Bács-Kiskun as well.

Rail
The length of railways was of 641 kilometres in 2001 (32% electrified) and the most important lines in the county are between Budapest and Szeged and the route of the international express trains crossing Hungary in northwestern-southeastern direction leading to Belgrade. In addition to the main and secondary lines, there are a number of narrow gauge tracks for 'nostalgia trains' which operate as tourist attractions.

Baja is the most important traffic junction of the southern part of the country. Its rail and public road junction is especially important due to the presence of the Danube bridge which provides a link between the Southern Great Plain and the Transdanubian region. The city has the best-equipped port in the country, where further development possibilities await the investors. At present a 120 places ro-ro port terminal is under construction.

Air
The only airport in the county, in Kecskemét, is a military one, chiefly used for the delivery of goods and occasionally for receiving civil aircraft. However, the county can be reached from the nearby Ferihegy Airport of Budapest in less than an hour.

Politics

County Assembly

The county is governed by the County board of supervisors, which is located in the county seat.

The Bács-Kiskun County Council, elected at the 2019 local government elections, is made up of 23 counselors, with the following party composition:

President of the County Assembly

Members of the National Assembly
The following members elected of the National Assembly during the 2022 parliamentary election:

Regional structure

Municipalities

Bács-Kiskun County has 1 urban county, 21 towns, 7 large villages and 90 villages.

Two-thirds of the population lives in the twenty cities/towns, among which the largest is the county seat, Kecskemét, where one-sixth of the total population resides. The town with the largest population density is Kalocsa (353/km2), the lowest population density is in the village of Újsolt (6/km2). City/towns have an average population density of 126, while villages have an average of 36/km2.

Even though Bács-Kiskun is the fifth largest county of Hungary by population, the population density is less than half of the country's average. The villages are typically large. 13% of the population lives on farms and homesteads.

City with county rights
(ordered by population, as of 2011 census)
Kecskemét (111,411) – county seat

Towns

Baja (36,267)
Kiskunfélegyháza (30,172)
Kiskunhalas (28,285)
Kalocsa (17,142)
Kiskőrös (14,236)
Kiskunmajsa (11,229)
Tiszakécske (11,430)
Lajosmizse (11,050)
Jánoshalma (9,008)
Kecel (8,711)
Kunszentmiklós (8,561)
Soltvadkert (7,309)
Solt (7,019)
Bácsalmás (6,753)
Kerekegyháza (6,284)
Szabadszállás (6,093)
Izsák (5,650)
Mélykút (5,200)
Tompa (4,267)
Dunavecse (3,881)
Hajós (3,104)

Villages

Akasztó
Ágasegyháza
Apostag
Ballószög
Balotaszállás
Bácsbokod 
Bácsborsód
Bácsszentgyörgy
Bácsszőlős
Bátmonostor
Bátya
Borota
Bócsa
Bugac 
Bugacpusztaháza
Császártöltés
Csátalja
Csávoly
Csengőd
Csikéria
Csólyospálos
Dávod
Drágszél
Dunaegyháza
Dunafalva
Dunapataj 
Dunaszentbenedek
Dunatetétlen
Dusnok
Érsekcsanád
Érsekhalma
Fajsz
Felsőlajos
Felsőszentiván
Foktő
Fülöpháza
Fülöpjakab
Fülöpszállás
Gara
Gátér
Géderlak
Harkakötöny
Harta 
Helvécia
Hercegszántó
Homokmégy
Imrehegy
Jakabszállás
Jászszentlászló
Kaskantyú
Katymár
Kelebia
Kéleshalom
Kisszállás
Kömpöc
Kunadacs
Kunbaja
Kunbaracs
Kunfehértó
Kunpeszér
Kunszállás
Ladánybene
Lakitelek 
Madaras
Mátételke
Miske
Móricgát
Nagybaracska
Nemesnádudvar
Nyárlőrinc
Ordas
Orgovány
Öregcsertő
Páhi
Pálmonostora
Petőfiszállás
Pirtó
Rém
Soltszentimre
Sükösd 
Szakmár
Szalkszentmárton
Szank
Szentkirály
Szeremle
Tabdi
Tass
Tataháza
Tázlár
Tiszaalpár 
Tiszaug
Uszód
Újsolt
Újtelek
Vaskút
Városföld
Zsana

 municipalities are large villages.

There are also public, religion and private schools in Bács- Kiskun county. 
Primaries are almost in all of the villages and towns. Some of them are quite big, but there are actually small schools with only a few students.
One of the oldest schools is the Calvinist Grammar School, which was founded in 1564. Religion schools are important in the county, as well as it is in this way all around in Hungary (in the county: Calvinist Grammar Schools- Kecskemét, Kiskunhalas, "Piarista" Catholic Grammar School, Kecskemét- for boys only-, "Angolkisasszonyok" Catholic Grammar School, Kecskemét- for girls only.). 100 years ago children could only learn in these schools, the first public grammar schools were founded only in the 1950s. Almost all of the religion schools were closed in the 1940s by the communist government, and were refounded only in the 1990s (like all of the Calvinist schools).
The main public grammar schools of the county are the Bibó István Grammar School (Kiskunhalas), Bányai Júlia Grammar School (Kecskemét), Katona József Grammar School (Kecskemét) and III. Béla Grammar School (Baja).
There are many competitions to the children in almost all of the subjects (mainly in Hungarian, English, German and Mathematics).
There's only one University in Kecskemét, the Károli Gáspár Calvinist University of Law (it used to be the Calvinist Grammar School from 1991 to 1997).
The College of Kecskemét have several fields of study, like Teacher, Gardener, and so on.

Miscellaneous topics

List of notable residents

Gallery

See also
 List of Bács-Kiskun-related topics
 List of people from Bács-Kiskun
 Former Bács-Bodrog County of the Kingdom of Hungary

References

External links
 Official site in English, Hungarian, German, and French
 Petőfi Népe (baon.hu) – The county portal
Information in English, Hungarian, and German
The Archive of Bács-Kiskun County

 
Counties of Hungary

1950 establishments in Hungary